Chunkou Town is a suburban town in Liuyang City, Hunan Province, People's Republic of China. It borders Longfu Town in the north, Gugang Town in the east and northeast, Guankou Subdistrict in the southeast, Jiaoxi Township in the south, Beisheng Town in the southwest, and Shashi Town in the west.

Administrative divisions
The town is divided into 11 villages and three communities, the following areas: 
 Nongda Community
 Yanggutan Community
 Heyuan Community
 Nanchong Village
 Yatou Village
 Gaotian Village
 Luyan Village
 Huangjingping Village
 Xiejia Village
 Shiyan Village
 Xiangping Village
 Shantianxin Village 
 Tonghui Village
 Fenglinhu Village

Geography
Liuyang River, also known as the mother river, flows through the town.

The town has a reservoir and a lake: Nankang Reservoir and Fenglin Lake.

Mount Wangfengjian is the peak-point in the town.

Economy
Chunkou Town's economy is based on nearby mineral resources and agricultural resources, such as lead minerals, copper minerals and kaolinite minerals.

Education
 Chunkou Middle School

Transportation

National Highway
The National Highway G106 passes across the town north to south.

County Roads
The town is connected to two county roads: X009 and X010.

Attraction 
Liudiequan Rafting is a well-known scenic spot in the town.

References

External links

2000 Census information from 

Divisions of Liuyang
Liuyang